Tennis, for the 2017 Island Games, held on clay courts at Slite and at Rackethallen, Visby, Gotland, Sweden in June 2017.

Medal table

Results

References

2017
Tennis
Island Games